The Grand Prix Cycliste de Montréal is a one-day professional bicycle road race held in Montreal, Quebec, Canada. Its first edition was held on September 12, 2010 as the final event in the 2010 UCI ProTour.

The Grand Prix Cycliste de Montréal and the Grand Prix Cycliste de Québec, held two days earlier, are collectively known as the "Laurentian Classics". In 2014, Simon Gerrans became the first to achieve the "Laurentian Double" by winning both the Grand Prix Cycliste de Québec and the Grand Prix Cycliste de Montréal in the same year (although Robert Gesink was a winner in Montréal in 2010 and Québec in 2013). In 2018, Michael Matthews became the second cyclist to achieve this double.

Iterations of the circuit have been used for the 1974 UCI Road World Championships, when Eddy Merckx won, and the 1976 Summer Olympics. The 1988 to 1992 Grand Prix des Amériques, part of the UCI Road World Cup from 1989 to 1992, also used a similar route in the same area.

After a two-year hiatus due to the Covid pandemic, the event will resume September 2022 with races in Quebec City on September 9 and in Montreal on September 11.

Route
The Grand Prix Cycliste de Montréal is not like many single day events, a point to point race, but a circuit based race. The riders race for 18 laps on a 12.3 km long circuit. Each lap of the circuit requires completing four climbs on the slopes around Mount Royal: Côte Camilien-Houde (1.8 km long and 8% average grade), Côte de la Polytechnique (780m long and 6% average grade) and Avenue du Parc (560m long and 4% average grade) and as of 2022 the new section on Pagnuelo street (534m long at 7.5% average grade) The finish is uphill on the Avenue du Parc.

The total cumulative climb is 4842 m as of 2022 with the new configuration, similar to that found in a mountain stage in the Tour de France, though at a lower altitude.

Winners

Multiple winners

Wins per country

References

External links

 Official website
 

 
UCI ProTour races
UCI World Tour races
Cycle races in Canada
Sports competitions in Montreal
Recurring sporting events established in 2010
2010 establishments in Quebec
Annual sporting events in Canada